= Kallur Yadahalli =

Small Railway Station On Mysore-Arasikere line Of Indian Railways

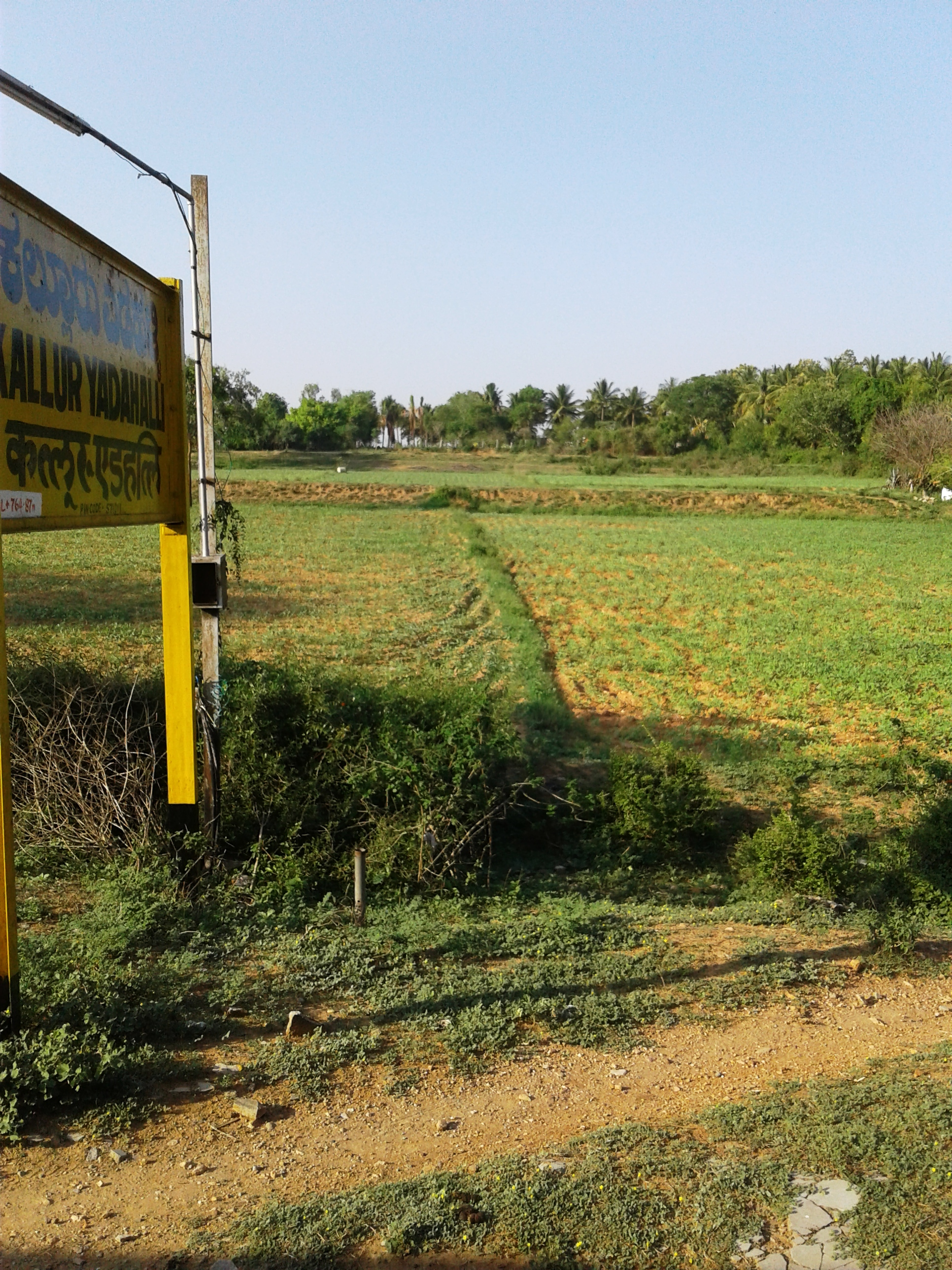
Kallur Yadahalli Railway Station

Kallur Yadahalli is a small railway station on Mysore-Arasikere line of Indian railways.

== Location ==
Kallur Yadahalli is located between Mysore and Hassan.
